The Police of Finland is a national government agency responsible for general police and law enforcement matters in the Republic of Finland. The Police of Finland is subordinate to the Ministry of the Interior and consists of the National Police Board, two national police units and 11 local police departments.

On October 1, 2003, the Public Order Act went into effect, standardizing public ordinances throughout the country.

Local police departments

The police is divided into police departments, which encompass the area of multiple municipalities; municipalities do not have police forces of their own. The function of each police department is to maintain general law and order, prevent crime, investigate crime and other events that threaten public order and safety, to carry out traffic control and surveillance and promote traffic safety, and perform all other duties prescribed by law or otherwise assigned to the police in their area. Local police departments are organized into uniformed patrol police (literally "order police") and criminal investigation police (literally "criminal police").

Local police also processes licenses and permits such as gun licenses, national ID cards and passports, and furthermore, enforces immigration decisions by the Finnish Immigration Service. Local police must also be notified when organizing public events that may significantly influence local public security and traffic. Driving licenses were once issued by the local police, but since 2016 are issued by Traficom (Finnish Transport and Communications Agency).

Alarm services are operated by Emergency Response Centres managed by the Ministry of the Interior in cooperation with the Ministry of Social Affairs and Health.

Local police departments as of 2014:
 Lapland Police Department (Rovaniemi) 
Central Finland Police Department (headquarters in Tampere)
 Eastern Finland Police Department (Kuopio)
 Eastern Uusimaa Police Department (Vantaa)
 Helsinki Police Department (Helsinki)
 Häme Police Department (Lahti)
 Ostrobothnia Police Department (Vaasa)
 Oulu Police Department (Oulu)
 Southeastern Finland Police Department (Kouvola)
 Southwestern Finland Police Department (Turku)
 Western Uusimaa Police Department (Espoo)

In addition, Åland has its own police department which falls under the responsibility of the Government of Åland (see law enforcement in Åland).

National police units

The National Bureau of Investigation is responsible for major criminal investigations and certain types of specialist services such as fingerprint recognition. The NBI was formed in 1954 to assist the country's other police elements in efforts against crime, particularly that of a serious or deeply rooted nature. A special concern of the NBI is white-collar crime. To carry out its mission, the force has advanced technical means at its disposal, and it maintains Finland's fingerprint and identification files. The NBI is not a part of the police, instead it is a separate nationwide law enforcement agency which assists local police with investigations. .

The Police University College in Tampere is responsible for police training, research and development.

The Finnish Security Intelligence Service is responsible for national security and the investigation of related crimes. The Supo was moved directly under the Ministry of the Interior in 2016.

The National Traffic Police was folded into the local police in 2013, thus local police is also responsible for highway patrol. Originally, local police districts were very small and had limited resources, so a separate mobile police organization was founded for riot control, alcohol law enforcement and reserve force duties. Political reliability and independence from local strongmen was also important because of the threat from fascists; indeed, the first task was to escort former president K.J. Ståhlberg back to his home after he was kidnapped by the Lapua Movement. This organization later evolved into a highway patrol. However, because of mergers, local police departments had become larger. Thus, the separate national organization was deemed redundant and traffic police units were subordinated to the local police departments instead, without change in the actual number of highway patrol officers.

Other nationally active formations

Special Intervention Unit, also known as "Bear Squad", is a specialized armed response unit. It is officially part of the Helsinki Police Department.

In June 2008, the Finnish police established a Police Incident Response Team tasked with improving the prevention, detection and management of serious information security incidents.

Vaativan ajotavan valvonta, also known as VATV- unit is a group of highly trained police officers specialized in high-speed driving and pursuits. The unit holds several unmarked high-performance cars ranging from 280 to 340 horsepower.

Police ranks
The Finnish police uses the following ranks:

Criminal investigators prefix their ranks with rikos-, "Detective", literally "Crime", e.g. rikostarkastaja.

Rank insignia on the shoulder epaulettes is all silver on blue with a silver button. The rank insignia for Senior Constable is a single bar, added with two chevrons for Sergeant. Police officers have bordered rows of oak leaves, with a Lion of Finland next to them. Additionally, on the collar there is pentagonal insignia that always has the emblem with laurel leaves and a border, but with colors slightly varying with rank; officers have a border around the pentagon.

Equipment
 Glock 17, (is being replaced with Walther P99Q)
 Heckler & Koch MP5, (is being replaced with CZ Scorpion Evo 3)
 Heckler & Koch G36C
 Taser X26
 FN 303
CZ Scorpion Evo 3
 Baton	
 Pepper spray
 TETRA
 Handcuffs
 Light and heavy armor

Vehicles

The most common patrol vehicle of police in Finland is Volkswagen Transporter, usually with 2.5 L diesel engines. In 2002 about one third of Finnish police cars were Transporters. Transporters are also used by border guards, customs, and sotilaspoliisi (military police).
Due to the bilingualism of the country, the right side of the vehicles is marked in Finnish language (POLIISI), the left side is marked in Swedish language (POLIS). The siren used for the Finnish police cars are also used for the police of Sweden.

Current vehicles of the Finnish police
Ford Kuga (unmarked)
Ford Focus (unmarked police cars)
Audi A8 (unmarked)
Mercedes-Benz E-class (unmarked units in Helsinki. Used mostly as escort cars
BMW 7 series (used mostly as unmarked escort cars for the President of Finland)
Citroën Berlingo (used as mobile speed camera units in Helsinki)
Ford Mondeo (2012–2018 models)
Ford Ranger (unmarked, in use in Helsinki)
Ford Transit (used as material transport by Espoo department and one in Kristinestad, used also by Bear Squad)
Opel Vectra (not in use, stored as reserve vehicles)
Opel Movano (unmarked, used by Pohjanmaa departments and Bear Squad)
Škoda Octavia (2013–2018 models, including Skoda octavia VRS and -scout)
Škoda Superb (2017– models, including Škoda superb sportline)
Ford Tourneo Connect (used as mobile speed camera cars and also used unmarked in Helsinki)
Toyota Avensis
Toyota Corolla Verso (unmarked police cars used in the Helsinki region)
Mitsubishi Outlander (in use as unmarked backup cars in Helsinki)
Mitsubishi Pajero (unmarked cars in Helsinki)
Toyota Land Cruiser (Used by Bear Squad)
Toyota Hilux (unmarked police cars in Rovaniemi, also used by Bear Squad)
Toyota Prius (in use at the Turku department)
Nissan Navara (unmarked police cars, mostly in use for personnel transport in Helsinki)
Nissan Primastar (unmarked, mostly used as a backup in emergency situations around Helsinki)
Nissan qashqai (unmarked)
Volkswagen Passat (regular-, alltrack- and r-line models)
Volkswagen Caddy (mobile speed camera units and unmarked police cars)
Volkswagen Tiguan (unmarked police vehicles. Including VW Tiguan R-Line)
Volkswagen Golf Variant (used as unmarked police cars)
Volkswagen E-Golf (in use in Helsinki)
Volkswagen Transporter (different variants, for example, K9, office and LGV monitoring units)
Mercedes-Benz Sprinter (LGV monitoring and riot control capabilities)
Mercedes-Benz G-Class (used by Bear Squad)
Mercedes-Benz G280 LAPV Enok (used by Bear Squad)
Mercedes-Benz CLS
Volvo V70
Ford Focus ST
Mercedes-Benz Vito (2019–) 
Hyundai Ioniq electric (unmarked)
Volkswagen Touran (unmarked)
BMW 5 series
Volvo S90
Toyota RAV4

Marked police motorcycles are usually either BMW K1200 RS, Yamaha FJR 1300, Yamaha FZ1, Yamaha XT660, Honda VFR1200 or KTM 1190 Adventure  models. Unmarked motorcycles are Yamaha YZF1000R Thunderace- and Yamaha YZF-R1 models. Motorcycles are used in pursuit situations. The quad bikes are also used in service, mostly used are Polaris Sportsman and Can-Am.

Additionally, Finnish police operates snowmobiles, water scooters and boats. Helsinki department also has a mounted police unit.

See also
Law enforcement in Finland
Law enforcement in Åland

References

External links

  (English)
 (Police) Study based on a citizen survey in Finland

Law enforcement agencies of Finland